Cassieardolla Story, known professionally as Cytherea, is an American pornographic actress and model. She is known for her ability to ejaculate (known as "squirting" in the adult industry) while performing sex acts.

Career
Cytherea took her stage name from the Greek goddess of love, beauty, and music. She originally had a Yahoo! fan group when she was recruited by an agent into the adult industry. Her video career started in 2003, and she has performed in over 350 movies. Her first scene was with Tyce Bune for I've Never Done That Before 14. Elegant Angel produced a series of movies featuring her dubbed as "Squirtwoman". Cytherea performed her first anal scene in the movie Cytherea's Anal Whores in 2006.

In 2005, she received the AVN Best New Starlet Award. She made her feature dancing debut at The Gentlemen's Club in Charlotte, North Carolina, also in that year. Cytherea formed a production company called Cytherea Productions in 2004.

In 2012, Cytherea signed with Ideal Image Management for representation, returning to performing after a brief stint in 2010–11 after a nearly four-year hiatus.

In 2014, Cytherea announced her intentions to crowdfund her return to the adult industry. She stated that since retiring from the industry in 2005, she has been a stay-at-home-mother to her two children. She also stated that she has had plastic surgery done in order to prepare herself for her return.

Appearances
She has appeared on cable television shows, most notably the HBO/Cinemax series Sex Games: Vegas, Playboy TV's Night Calls and has been a guest on the Tom Leykis Show and The Howard Stern Show.

Cytherea also hosted an industry talk and interview radio show on KSEX in Los Angeles, California called Goddess of Gush. According to her website, the show was cancelled in 2006 and Cytherea has toured as a feature dancer in the past.

She has also had minor roles in a variety of movies such as the thriller Tumbling After and the comedy film Finishing the Game: The Search for a New Bruce Lee, both in 2007, and the cable television series Sex Games Vegas in 2005.

Personal life
Cytherea was born in Salt Lake City, Utah. She has two children and is a former Mormon.

Cytherea's house was invaded and robbed in January 2015, which involved a sexual assault by three armed men. Police believed the house was selected at random. Cytherea, her husband, and her two children were all home at the time.

She was married to Timothy Hale. Hale died at the age of 52 on November 2, 2016.

Awards and nominations

References

External links

 
 
 
 

Date of birth missing (living people)
21st-century American businesspeople
21st-century American businesswomen
Actresses from Salt Lake City
American female adult models
American pornographic film actresses
American women company founders
American company founders
Bisexual pornographic film actresses
Former Latter Day Saints
LGBT adult models
American LGBT businesspeople
American LGBT actors
LGBT people from Utah
Living people
Pornographic film actors from Utah
21st-century American LGBT people